Rivellia micans is a species of signal flies (insects in the family Platystomatidae).

References

Further reading

 

micans
Articles created by Qbugbot
Insects described in 1873